Cedar Lane is a historic farm property at 9040 Virginia State Route 249 in central New Kent County, Virginia.  Built about 1782, it is one of the county's better examples of early Federal period architecture.  It is a two-story frame structure, with a gabled roof and clapboarded exterior.  An open hip-roofed porch extends across the front of the main block, which is flanked by two-story and one-story wings.  It was probably built by either William Poindexter or by his daughter Ann and her husband Thomas Howle, and achieved much of its present form by 1860.

The property was listed on the National Register of Historic Places in 2017.

See also
National Register of Historic Places listings in New Kent County, Virginia

References

Houses completed in 1782
Houses in New Kent County, Virginia
Houses on the National Register of Historic Places in Virginia
National Register of Historic Places in New Kent County, Virginia
1782 establishments in Virginia